Brian Healy may refer to:

 Brian Healy (footballer) (born 1968), Scottish former footballer
 Brian Healy (musician), musician in the band Dead Artist Syndrome